San Carlos volcanic field is a monogenetic volcanic field in  Arizona. It is a small field covering approximately 50 km2 or less of volcanic cones and lava flows. The basanite to hawaiite basaltic flows contain xenoliths of peridotite. The Peridot Mesa vent is noted for the occurrence of quantities of gem quality peridot found within lherzolite xenolith nodules.

Notable Vents

See also
 List of volcanoes in the United States

References

Volcanic fields of Arizona
Landforms of Graham County, Arizona
Monogenetic volcanic fields
Neogene volcanism
Pleistocene volcanism